La Pampa is the capital of Samuel Pastor District in Camaná Province in Peru.

References 

Populated places in the Arequipa Region